The Court of Session is the primary court of first instance in criminal cases in Pakistan, and most serious criminal cases are tried in it. The court also has limited civil and appellate jurisdiction.

References

External links
Court Structure of Pakistan

Court system of Pakistan
Judiciary of Pakistan